is a Japanese company that operates Tsutaya (蔦屋), a chain of video rental shops and bookstores throughout Japan and Taiwan. The company is headquartered in Ebisu, Tokyo. The stock of the company was formerly listed in the first section of the Tokyo Stock Exchange, but it has since been delisted following a management buyout in 2011.

History 

As of December 2013, the company and its franchisees operate 1,461 Tsutaya rental shops in Japan.

The T Card, the membership card of Tsutaya, works as a platform for a cross-industry loyalty program. As of May 2010, more than 35 million holders of the card earn "T Points" at FamilyMart, Book Off, Lotteria, and so forth as well as Tsutaya shops.

On 17 March 2017, the company acquired magazine publishing brand Tokuma Shoten. The deal was expected to be completed at the end of March. In September 2017, the Culture Convenience Club signed a deal with China's CITIC Press Group to create a joint cultural content distribution platform.

References

External links
 
 Official website
 Tsutaya official website

Retail companies established in 1982
Retail companies based in Tokyo
Companies formerly listed on the Tokyo Stock Exchange
Video rental services
Bookstores of Japan